Nilambur Kingdom or Nilambur Kovilakam was a former feudal city-state in present-day Kerala state, India, situated near to the Nilgiri range of the Western Ghats. It was ruled by Samantha  Kshatriyas ( Nair rulers) who were the vassals of the Zamorins of Calicut, with the capital located 25 kilometers north of Manjeri in present-day Malappuram district. Famous Vettakkorumakan Kovil (famous for Pattutsavam) and Nilambur Kovilakam are situated on the banks of Chali river and Nilambur is known for its unique teak plantations and the Teak Museum. The Nilambur – Shoranur Railway Line was built by the British to carry timber and other products from these forests to the outside world. 

The area was an ancient tribal settlement, and in Nilambur forests the remains of ancient temples can be found. Cholanaikkans, one of the most primitive tribes in South India and one of the last remaining hunter-gatherer tribes, numbering only 360 in 1991, first contacted in the 1960s, are seen in the Karulai and Chunkathara forest ranges near .

See also
 Kovilakathumuri
 Amarambalam
 Adyanpara Falls
 vaniyambalam

References

External links
 Nilambur Kovilakam
 Nilambur.com tourism site
 Destination details

History of Malappuram district
Feudal states of Kerala